Armand Zorn (born 18 July 1988) is a German politician of the Social Democratic Party (SPD) who has been serving as a member of the Bundestag since 2021, representing the Frankfurt am Main I district.

Early life and education
Zorn was born 1988 in Yaoundé in Cameroon and moved to Germany in 2000. His family settled in Halle in Saxony-Anhalt where he was educated. He graduated from Martin Luther University of Halle-Wittenberg in 2012 with a degree in Political and Historical Science, followed by two years at the Sciences Po in Paris with a diploma in European affairs. He then received a Masters degree at the University of Konstanz and a Master of Laws at Martin Luther University.

Zorn worked at the representative offices of the German Ministry of Finance in Hong Kong and Macao and at the French National Assembly. Afterwards he worked as a consultant for PricewaterhouseCoopers.

Political career
In 2011, Zorn joined the SPD and in 2019, became a member of the governing board for the Frankfurt Social Democrats. 

In 2021, Zorn ran in the 2021 German federal election for the SPD.  While he was on the party's list at number 23, which did not offer a strong chance to enter the Bundestag, he won the direct mandate in his district with 29% of the vote. In parliament, he has been serving on the Finance Committee, the Committee on Digital Affairs and the Parliamentary Advisory Council on Sustainable Development.

In addition to his committee assignments, Zorn has been a member of the German delegation to the Franco-German Parliamentary Assembly since 2022.

Other activities
 Business Forum of the Social Democratic Party of Germany, Member of the Political Advisory Board (since 2022)

References

Living people
1988 births
Members of the Bundestag for Hesse
Members of the Bundestag 2021–2025
Members of the Bundestag for the Social Democratic Party of Germany

Cameroonian emigrants to Germany
Naturalized citizens of Germany